Marianne Bruns (31 August 1897 – 1 January 1994)  was a twentieth-century German novelist and poet.

Biography
Bruns was born in Leipzig. After studying music, she began writing stories for magazines, and then novels. 
Starting in 1929, she also became a broadcaster on the German radio, often reading from her poetry on programs designed for women and children. She died in Dresden.

Works

Fiction
 Telemachos, Novelle, 1927
 Das rechtschaffene Herz, Roman, 1939
 Über meinen grünen Garten fliegen die Schwalben, Roman, 1940
 Die Tochter der Parze, Roman, 1943
 Flugsamen, Roman, 1948
 Wiegand der Feuerträger,  1949
 Die Spur des namenlosen Malers, 1975 (historical novel about   Jerg Ratgeb)

Children's books
 Jau und Trine laden ein, 1933
 Die Schwedin und die drei Indianer, 1934
 Willi und Kamilla. Zwei Kinder wachsen heran, 1935
 Das verschwundene Messer, Laienspiel für Kinder, 1949

Non-Fiction
 Seliger Kreislauf. Gedichte, 1925
 ed.: Jean Paul, Ausgewählte Werke, 1925
 Reise durch Schweden, 1926
 Die Dioskuren in Olympia. Roman, 1936 (rep in 1937 as: Die Auserwählten. Roman aus Alt-Griechenland)
 Tobbys Buch. Eine Theatergeschichte, 1949
 Geht Christel Peters zur Bühne? 1951
 Uns hebt die Flut, 1952 (about the beginnings of the women's movement)
 Glück fällt nicht vom Himmel, 1954
 Darüber wächst kein Gras, 1956
 Bauer und Richter, 1956
 Deutsche Stimmen 1956. Neue Prosa und Lyrik aus Ost und West, 1956
 Frau Doktor privat, 1957
 Der Junge mit den beiden Namen, 1958
 Die Silbergrube, 1959
 Das ist Diebstahl, 1960
 ed.: Briefe aus Zittau, 1960
 Schuldig befunden, 1961
 Zwischen Pflicht und Kür, 1962
 Hausfrauenbrigade. Eine Szene, 1962
 Verständnis für die Neunte, 1962
 Die Lichtung, 1965
 Der neunte Sohn des Veit Stoß, 1967
 Großaufnahme leicht retuschiert, 1972
 Zeichen ohne Wunder, 1977
 Der grüne Zweig, 1979
 Szenenwechsel, 1982
 Luftschaukel, 1985
 Wiedersehen, 1987
 Nahe Ferne, 1989

References

 Schriftsteller im Rundfunk - Autorenauftritte im Rundfunk der Weimarer Republik 1924–1932 at the website of the Deutsches Rundfunkarchiv
 Freital hat nun auch offiziell eine Marianne-Bruns-Straße, sz-online.de
 Marianne Bruns at the website of the city Freital

1897 births
1994 deaths
Writers from Leipzig
People from the Kingdom of Saxony
East German writers
East German women
German women novelists
German women poets
20th-century German poets
20th-century German novelists
20th-century German women writers